Solidago tortifolia, commonly known as twistleaf goldenrod, is a North American species of goldenrod in the family Asteraceae. It is found in the eastern and southern United States, primarily along the Atlantic and Gulf coastal plain from Maryland to Texas.

Solidago tortifolia is  a perennial herb up to 130 cm (52 inches or 4 1/3 feet) tall, with a woody underground caudex or rhizomes. One plant can produce as many as 300 small yellow flower heads in a large, branching array at the top of the plant.

References

tortifolia
Plants described in 1923
Flora of the United States